Veronica formosa is a flowering plant species of the family Plantaginaceae, endemic to Tasmania in Australia. It is a subshrub which grows to between 0.5 and 2 metres high. The elliptic to lanceolate leaves are 7 to 15 mm long. The flowers are pale lilac or violet blue and appear in racemes from late spring to early summer.

Cultivation
Plants may be grown in shade, but a position in full sun is desirable to maximise flowering. They are frost tolerant, being hardy to -7 °C. A compact shape can be maintained by cutting back old stems after flowering.

References

Flora of Tasmania
formosa